Empress of China was the consort of an Emperor of China.

Empress of China may also refer to:

 Empress of China (1783), a sailing ship built as a privateer; the first American ship to sail from the newly independent United States to China
 RMS Empress of China, three Canadian Pacific Steamships ocean liners, one from 1891 to 1912, the other two briefly named Empress of China in 1921
 The Empress of China (film), a 1953 West German film
 The Empress of China, a 2014 Chinese television drama series starring Fan Bingbing as a character based on the historical character Wu Zetian